Keelara  is a village in the southern state of Karnataka, India. It is located in the Mandya taluk of Mandya district. The village is around 10 km from Mandya city and 96 km from the capital city of Karnataka via NH-275.

Demographics
 India census, Keelara had a population of 5263 with 2629 males and 2634 females.

Notable people 
Sri. K. V. Shankaragowda - politician, known as Nitya Sachiva

Prof K M Veerappa,
Principal(Retd.) Yuvarajas College, Mysore.

Sri.K L Anandegowda- Town planner.
Retired Director of Town planning,
Govt.of Karnataka.

Sri.K T Veerappa- Retired  Director, Prasaranga,  Uni. of Mysore.

Dr T.Chandrashkar, Bangalore. 

Sri.K L Mariswamy, Retired  Prof., Govt.College of Pharmacy, Bangalore.

Dr K L Mahadevappa, Retired Prof., of Biochemistry, KIMS, Bangalore.

Sri. KV Chandramouli, Retired Deputy Director of Boilers, Government of Karnataka.

Dr. Babu Veeregowda, Vice-President, HNTB, NewYork.

Ravishankar Gowda

See also
 Mandya
 Districts of Karnataka

References

External links
 Official website of Mandya district

Villages in Mandya district